Ralls County Courthouse and Jail-Sheriff's House is a historic courthouse, jail and sheriff's residence located at New London, Ralls County, Missouri.  The courthouse was built in 1858 and is a two-story, "T"-shaped, Greek Revival style limestone building. An addition was constructed in 1936. It has a two-story, tetrastyle full-width portico topped by an unusually tall cupola.  The Jail-Sheriff's House is a two-story, "T"-shaped limestone building with a one-story frame addition.

It was listed on the National Register of Historic Places in 1972.

References

County courthouses in Missouri
Courthouses on the National Register of Historic Places in Missouri
Greek Revival architecture in Missouri
Government buildings completed in 1858
Buildings and structures in Ralls County, Missouri
National Register of Historic Places in Ralls County, Missouri